Palau has flags for its sixteen states.

See also
 Flag of Palau

References

National symbols of Palau
Palau geography-related lists
Palau
Palau
Peleliu